The Spokane, Portland and Seattle Railroad Warehouse, also known as the Christensen Electric Building, is a building located in Portland, Oregon, listed on the National Register of Historic Places. A former warehouse used by the Spokane, Portland and Seattle Railway, it has been converted into an office building.  It was added to the National Register in 1996.

See also
 National Register of Historic Places listings in Northwest Portland, Oregon
 North Bank Depot Buildings

References

1908 establishments in Oregon
Buildings and structures completed in 1908
National Register of Historic Places in Portland, Oregon
Northwest Portland, Oregon
Railway buildings and structures on the National Register of Historic Places in Oregon
Railway freight houses on the National Register of Historic Places
Richardsonian Romanesque architecture in Oregon
Spokane, Portland and Seattle Railway
Transportation buildings and structures in Portland, Oregon